'Negoiță is a Romanian surname. Notable people with the surname include:

Dumitru Negoiță, Romanian javelin thrower
Liviu Negoiță, Romanian politician and lawyer
Liviu Negoiță (footballer)
Robert Negoiță
Teodor Negoiță

Romanian-language surnames